Kaldbukta is a bay in Van Mijenfjorden in Nordenskiöld Land at Spitsbergen, Svalbard. The bay has a width of about 11.5 kilometers. The large valley Reindalen ends into Kaldbukta. The largest river flowing into the bay is Reindalselva, and also Semmeldalselva and Kalvdalselva ends in Kaldbukta.

References

Bays of Spitsbergen